Miss Europe 1948 was the 12th annual Miss Europe. The Miss Europe pageant was cancelled for 9 years due to the onset of World War II. The pageant came back with new sponsors and with only 12 entrants. The new sponsors are Mr. Roger Zeigler (of the Moulin Rouge) and Claude Berr both of whom later created the Mondial Events Organization which owned the pageant until after Miss Europe 2002 when Zeigler and the Mondial Events Org. sold the pageant to Endemol France (the French branch of the Dutch company Endemol). This is the 1st edition under Mondial Events. No new contestants competed but some returning countries came back.

Results

Placements

Delegates
 

 - Ingrid Jonaszin
 - Odette Schollaert
 - UNKNOWN
 - UNKNOWN
 - Anna-Liisa Leppänen
 - Jacqueline Donny
 - Pamela Bayliss
 - Rossana Martini
 - Helena Sutter
 - UNKNOWN

References

External links 
 

1948 beauty pageants
1948 in France
Miss Europe
Beauty pageants in France